Dashti Leyl-e Hoseynabad (also Romanized as Dashtī Leyl-e Ḩoseynābād; also known as Dasht-e Leyl) is a village in Zamkan Rural District, in the Central District of Salas-e Babajani County, Kermanshah Province, Iran. At the 2006 census, its population was 172, in 30 families.

References 

Populated places in Salas-e Babajani County